Luke Scott (born 12 September 1974) is an Australian former rugby league footballer who played for the North Queensland Cowboys in the NRL. He primarily played .

Playing career
A Lismore Workers junior, Scott attended Trinity Catholic College from here Scott represented NSWCCCC in their undefeated tour of NZ in 1992, before joining the Souths Magpies in the Queensland Cup. While playing for Souths, Scott signed with the North Queensland Cowboys.

In Round 6 of the 1997 Super League season, Scott made his first grade debut in the Cowboys' 16–42 loss to the Brisbane Broncos.  In his debut season with the club he played 12 games, scoring three tries. Scott also played in all 6 world club challenge games that year including the WCC tour of the UK.   In 1998, Scott’s season was cut short by a shoulder injury and he played 10 games.

In 1999, Scott joined the Redcliffe Dolphins. In his five years with the Dolphins, Scott played in four Queensland Cup Grand Finals, winning in 2000 and 2002, in which he captained the side. Scott represented Queensland residents on 4 occasions and captioned the side in 2002 while playing for the Dolphins. Scott finished his Queensland Cup career having played 129 games, scoring 36 tries. After leaving the Dolphins, Scott returned to Lismore, playing for the Marist Brothers Rams.

In 2015, he was named in the QRL's Queensland Cup 20th anniversary team.

Statistics

Super League/NRL
 Statistics are correct to the end of the 1998 season

References

1974 births
Living people
Australian rugby league players
North Queensland Cowboys players
Souths Logan Magpies players
Redcliffe Dolphins players
Rugby league second-rows